"Dunder Mifflin Infinity" is the third and fourth episode of the fourth season of the American comedy television series The Office, and the show's fifty-sixth and fifty-seventh episode overall. The episode was written by Michael Schur, who also acts in the show, and directed by Craig Zisk. It first aired in the United States on October 4, 2007, on NBC.

In this episode, Ryan Howard (B. J. Novak) returns to his old office and reveals his plan to bring technology to Dunder Mifflin. Michael Scott (Steve Carell) and Dwight Schrute (Rainn Wilson) try to prove that the personal touch is better than technology. Meanwhile, Jim Halpert (John Krasinski) and Pam Beesly (Jenna Fischer) reveal their relationship to the rest of the office, Kelly Kapoor (Mindy Kaling) attempts to reunite with Ryan, and Dwight and Angela Martin's (Angela Kinsey) relationship continues to plummet.

Plot 

Ryan Howard (B. J. Novak) returns to the Scranton, Pennsylvania branch of Dunder Mifflin for the first time since his promotion to the corporate headquarters. Although he sports a much more urbane look and attitude, he garners little respect from his former peers. Ryan introduces "Dunder Mifflin Infinity," his initiative to revitalize the company with new technology. Michael Scott (Steve Carell) is initially excited about the prospect of getting a BlackBerry, but is warned by Creed Bratton (Creed Bratton) that the program is a ploy to get rid of older workers. Creed dyes his hair black with printer ink in an attempt to convince everyone that he is much younger. Michael holds a conference room meeting on the subject of ageism. To show that personal interaction is more effective than new technology, Michael and Dwight Schrute (Rainn Wilson) decide to go out and win back the clients they lost in the past year with gift baskets. Each manager they encounter refuses to consider returning to Dunder Mifflin unless the company improves its technology, such as Dunder Mifflin's website. While driving back to the office, Michael pretends to misinterpret his rental car's GPS directions and intentionally drives into Lake Scranton. He uses this as further proof that new technology is useless because it tried to kill him. After the lake incident, he and Dwight walk back to one of the former clients to awkwardly get back their gift basket, causing a scene.

Meanwhile, Pam Beesly (Jenna Fischer) and Jim Halpert (John Krasinski) are exposed as a couple when Toby Flenderson (Paul Lieberstein) circulates a memo about public displays of affection. Jim secretly informs Pam that Dwight and Angela Martin (Angela Kinsey) are dating, only to discover that she already knew. Meanwhile, Dwight attempts to make amends for the death of Angela's cat Sprinkles by giving her a stray cat he found in his barn, named Garbage. Angela rejects the gift. Kelly Kapoor (Mindy Kaling) tries to restart her relationship with Ryan, an effort he ignores until she tells him she is pregnant. After going out to dinner, Ryan learns that Kelly's pregnancy claim was a lie that Kelly used in attempt to get them back together. Back at the office, Ryan asks Pam to create a logo for Dunder Mifflin Infinity. Pam is excited about the opportunity to use her art background, but Ryan uses the logo as an excuse to ask her out, which he does in front of Jim. Pam responds that she is dating Jim, which leaves the new boss thoroughly embarrassed.

Production 

The episode was the first episode of the series directed by Craig Zisk. Zisk had previously directed episodes of Nip/Tuck, Weeds, Scrubs, Smallville, and The Single Guy. "Dunder Mifflin Infinity" was written by Michael Schur, who plays Dwight's Amish cousin Mose.

For Ryan's new appearance this season, the writers originally had B. J. Novak grow a goatee. Show runner and executive producer Greg Daniels decided to have Novak lose the goatee, because according to Novak "a goatee would make Ryan a flat-out chump. And we wanted it to be more subtle." In addition to his five o'clock shadow, Ryan was also seen wearing black clothes. Novak explained that "We wanted him to dress as obnoxious as possible. As much black as possible." "Dunder Mifflin Infinity" went along with a website that had been created with the same name. The website was part of a game in which fans of The Office would sign up, and become "employees" of different "branches". Members of the site would perform tasks such as design a logo for the company or make Creed look young again.

Reception 
"Dunder Mifflin Infinity" received 4.5/11 in the ages 18–49 demographic in the Nielsen ratings. This means that 4.5 percent of all households with an 18- to 49-year-old living in it watched the episode, and eleven percent had their televisions tuned to the channel at any point. The episode was watched by 8.49 million viewers.

"Dunder Mifflin Infinity" received mixed reviews from critics, with Michael driving his car into the lake being particularly panned by critics and viewers. Entertainment Weekly'''s Christine Fenno commented that she thought "Michael seemed a bit more focused than usual, even competent at moments. And then he drove into a lake." Jack Rodgers, from TV Guide said that his "favorite thing about this episode was the sly parallel that connects the three love stories" and "Michael’s obsession with sticking to his old methods rather than learning to change and embrace technology". Will Leitch of New York'' criticized the episode, saying that Michael driving into the lake felt more like the actions of a "cartoon character", than "based in reality". Leitch did say that if "we can get Michael out of that lake and back in a conference room with Ryan, we'll have something."

References

External links 
 "Dunder Mifflin Infinity" at NBC.com
 
 

The Office (American season 4) episodes
2007 American television episodes
Television episodes written by Michael Schur
The Office (American TV series) episodes in multiple parts